Power Struggle was a professional wrestling event promoted by New Japan Pro-Wrestling. It took place on November 6, 2021, in Osaka, Osaka, at the Osaka Prefectural Gymnasium. It was the eleventh event under the Power Struggle chronology.

Storylines

Power Struggle will feature professional wrestling matches that will involve different wrestlers from pre-existing scripted feuds and storylines. Wrestlers portrayed villains, heroes, or less distinguishable characters in the scripted events that built tension and culminated in a wrestling match or series of matches.

Results

References

External links
The official New Japan Pro-Wrestling website

2021 in professional wrestling
21st century in Osaka
Events in Osaka
2021
November 2021 sports events in Japan
Professional wrestling in Osaka